The European Journal of Lymphology and Related Problems is a quarterly peer-reviewed medical journal published by the European Society of Lymphology. The journal was established in 1990 and covers research in the fields of lymphology and related areas. The editor-in-chief is Francesco Boccardo (University of Genoa). In addition to the printed journal, content is distributed free of cost online in PDF format.

Abstracting and indexing
The journal is abstracted and indexed in Embase and Scopus.

References

External links

Lymphology
Quarterly journals
English-language journals
Publications established in 1990
Academic journals published by learned and professional societies
Cardiology journals